Less than 3 may refer to:
 <3, an emoticon meaning love or heart, see List of emoticons
 Less Than Three, a single and a song by the band We Are the Physics
 Less than 3, an album by the band Mindless Self Indulgence
 Less Than Three, a song by German music producer TheFatRat 
 Less Than Three, a song made by Australian DJ S3RL